Nesiocina is a genus of tropical land snails with an operculum. It is a genus of terrestrial gastropod mollusks in the subfamily Helicininae of the family Helicinidae.

Species
 Nesiocina abdoui Richling & Bouchet, 2013
 Nesiocina discoidea (Pease, 1868)
 Nesiocina gambierensis Richling & Bouchet, 2013
 Nesiocina grohi Richling & Bouchet, 2013
 Nesiocina mangarevae Richling & Bouchet, 2013
 Nesiocina parvula (Pease, 1868)
 Nesiocina pauciplicata Richling & Bouchet, 2013
 Nesiocina pazi (Crosse, 1865)
 Nesiocina solidula (G. B. Sowerby I, 1839)
 Nesiocina superoperculata Richling & Bouchet, 2013
 Nesiocina trilamellata Richling & Bouchet, 2013
 Nesiocina unilamellata Richling & Bouchet, 2013
 Nesiocina villosa (Anton, 1838)

References

External links
 
 Richling I. & Bouchet P. (2013). Extinct even before scientific recognition: a remarkable radiation of helicinid snails (Helicinidae) on the Gambier Islands, French Polynesia. Biodiversity and Conservation. 22: 2433-2468

Helicinidae
Gastropod genera